Pont du Diable may refer to:
 Pont du Diable, Hérault, a bridge over a steep-sided gorge in the Hérault département of France constructed in the 11th century
 Pont du Diable (Villemagne-l'Argentière), a bridge over the river Mare in the Hérault département of France constructed in the 18th century
 Pont du Diable (Céret), a medieval stone arch bridge at Céret, France

See also
 Devil's Bridge
 :fr:Pont du Diable, a more extensive list in French Wikipedia